Breathing the Fire is the third studio album by American extreme metal band Skeletonwitch. It was released on October 13, 2009. The first album to feature bassist Evan Linger.

Track listing

Personnel
Skeletonwitch
 Chance Garnette - vocals
 Nate "N8 Feet Under" Garnette - guitars
 Scott "Scunty D." Hedrick - guitars
 Evan "Loosh" Linger - bass
 Derrick "Mullet Chad" Nau - drums

References

2009 albums
Skeletonwitch albums